Lawrence Henry "Laurie" Bickerton (10 August 1917 – 10 August 2009) was an Australian rules footballer who played with Fitzroy in the Victorian Football League (VFL) during their final premiership season in 1944. He played on the half back flank in the Grand Final.

External links

Laurie Bickerton's obituary
World War II Nominal Roll

1917 births
2009 deaths
Australian rules footballers from Victoria (Australia)
Royal Australian Air Force personnel of World War II
Fitzroy Football Club players
Fitzroy Football Club Premiership players
Oakleigh Football Club players
One-time VFL/AFL Premiership players